CTSP may refer to:

 Central Taiwan Science Park, an industrial park in Taiwan
 Chinese Taipei School Penang, an international school in Penang, Malaysia